FIVE is the fifth studio album by American singer and songwriter Prince Royce. It was released on February 24, 2017 by Sony Music Latin. The album includes collaborations with artists such as Shakira, Chris Brown, Zendaya, Farruko, Gerardo Ortíz, Gente de Zona and Arturo Sandoval.

Although the album contains some lyrics in English, it is Royce's first mainly Spanish-language album since Soy el Mismo in 2013. FIVE, predominantly of the bachata genre, became Royce's fourth number-one album on the Billboard Top Latin Albums chart in the United States.

The album was preceded by the release of its lead single, "Culpa al Corazón", on November 13, 2015. Four other singles were released to promote the album between 2016 and 2017: "La Carretera", "Moneda", "Ganas Locas", and "Déjà Vu". This last single became the album's most successful commercially and was certified 9× Platinum (Latin) by the Recording Industry Association of America (RIAA) in the US.

Commercial performance
The album debuted at number 25 on the Billboard 200, and sold 19,000 album-equivalent units (16,000 in pure sales plus 3,000 track equivalent and streaming equivalent albums), during its first week of release in the United States.

Track listing

Charts

Weekly charts

Year-end charts

Album certifications

See also
2017 in Latin music

References

2017 albums
Prince Royce albums
Spanish-language albums
Sony Music Latin albums